Joseph Berlin ({Heb:יוסף ברלין}) (1877-1952) was a Russian-born Israeli architect who worked in Russia and Mandatory Palestine.

Biography
Joseph Berlin was born in Mogilev, Russia (today in Belarus). He immigrated to British-ruled Palestine with his family in 1921.

Architecture career

He designed over a hundred buildings around the country, many of them iconic.  His son Zeev Berlin was also an architect, and the two worked together.

Berlin designed 80 buildings in Tel Aviv, among them his own home on Rothschild Boulevard in the city center. His later projects incorporated many elements of the Bauhaus style, with fewer decorative additions, flat roofs and ribbon windows.

Notable works

 1922/25 - Berlin-Pasovsky House
 1923 - Arza sanatorium, Motza
 1923/26 - Łodzia House, Tel Aviv
 1923 - Diesel Power Station, Tel Aviv (16, HaHashmal Street)
 1924 - Zissman House, Tel Aviv
 1925 - Ohel Moed synagogue, Tel Aviv
 1926 - Beit Awad
 1928 - Mograbi Cinema, Tel Aviv

See also
Architecture of Israel

References

Further reading
 Berkovich, Gary. Reclaiming a History. Jewish Architects in Imperial Russia and the USSR. Volume 1. Late Imperial Russia: 1891–1917. Grunberg Verlag. Weimar und Rostock. 2021. P. 70. .
 Josef Berlin, Architect: Between Little Tel Aviv and the White City, Baruch Ravid (Binyan Vediur, 2005)

1877 births
1952 deaths
Architects in Mandatory Palestine
People from Mogilev
Soviet emigrants to Mandatory Palestine
Israeli people of Russian-Jewish descent
Burials at Kiryat Shaul Cemetery
Residents of the Benois House